The Waldo Hotel in Clarksburg, West Virginia was built between 1901 and 1904 by Congressman and Senator Nathan Goff, Jr. and named for his father, Waldo P. Goff. It was designed by Harrison Albright.

It originally housed a bank and shops on the first floor with hotel rooms above. Once one of the state's most luxurious hotels and the social center of Clarksburg, the Waldo Hotel was a gathering place for parties, weddings, and civic meetings.

As of 2022, the Waldo Hotel had been empty for 30 years. A non-profit organization hopes to renovate it.

References

Buildings and structures in Clarksburg, West Virginia
Hotel buildings completed in 1904
1904 establishments in West Virginia